Borislav "Bora" Stanković (9 July 1925 – 20 March 2020) was a Serbian basketball player and coach, as well as a longtime administrator in the sport's various governing bodies, including FIBA and the International Olympic Committee. He played 36 games for the Yugoslavian national basketball team internationally.

While he was FIBA's Secretary General, Stanković pushed for FIBA to allow players from the NBA to compete at the Summer Olympics. In 1989, he introduced a resolution to change FIBA rules to allow players from the NBA to compete, and the subsequent vote passed 56-13. This led to the formation of the United States' Dream Team that won gold at the 1992 Summer Olympics in Barcelona.

For his contributions to the game of basketball, he was inducted into the Basketball Hall of Fame in 1991. He was inducted into the Women's Basketball Hall of Fame in 2000, and the FIBA Hall of Fame in 2007.

Biography
Simultaneous to his studies, Stanković played professionally for Crvena zvezda (1946–1948), Železničar Beograd (1948–1950), and Partizan (1950–1953), and was on the senior Yugoslav national basketball team for five years, in the early 1950s. After he retired from the game, he coached OKK Beograd for ten consecutive seasons (1953–1963), and for a season in 1965. He then moved on to the Italian club Pallacanestro Cantù, spending three seasons as its head coach (1966–1969).

Throughout his lengthy involvement with basketball, Stanković was a part of the Yugoslav Olympic Committee, the International Olympic Committee, and the Board of Trustees at the Basketball Hall of Fame. He served as FIBA's second Secretary General from 1976 to 2002.

From the beginning of his tenure as Secretary General, Stanković wanted FIBA to allow NBA players in international competitions, especially the Olympics.  At the FIBA Congress in Madrdid in 1986, his attempt to pass that resolution failed by a vote of 31-27. Undeterred, he continued to campaign for the idea, and at the 1989 FIBA Congress in Munich, his resolution passed by a vote of 56-13. Beginning at the 1992 Summer Olympics in Barcelona, NBA players began competing at all of FIBA's international competitions from then on.

Other than Serbian, Stanković fluently spoke six other languages. He was inducted into the Basketball Hall of Fame in 1991, as a contributor. He was inducted into the Women's Basketball Hall of Fame in 2000. In 2007, he was enshrined as a contributor into the FIBA Hall of Fame. FIBA named the annual international basketball cup the "FIBA Stanković Continental Champions' Cup".

Personal life
Stanković was born in Bihać, Kingdom of Serbs, Croats and Slovenes (present-day Bosnia and Herzegovina). Early in his life, he moved to Novi Sad, and then to the Syrmian town of Ledinci, during World War II. After the war, Stanković went to Belgrade, where he graduated from the University of Belgrade, with a degree in veterinary medicine. In 1966, he pledged his efforts to basketball full-time, ending a 10-year career as a veterinary inspector for meat control in Belgrade. 

Stanković died on 20 March 2020 in Belgrade. He had one daughter, two granddaughters and two great grandchildren.

Orders and special awards 
The following is a selected list of orders and special awards:
 Olympic Order (1987)
  Order of Merit of FR Germany (1987)
  National Order of the Lion (1999)
  Knight of the Legion of Honour (2001)
  Order of Merits of FR Yugoslavia (2002)
  Order of Honor of Republika Srpska (2010)
 FIBA Order of Merit (2015)

In popular culture
Stanković is portrayed by Aleksandar Radojičić in the 2015 Serbian sports drama We Will Be the World Champions and the 2016 Serbian TV series The World Champions.

See also
 Radomir Šaper
 Aleksandar Nikolić
 Nebojša Popović

References

External links
 FIBA Hall of Fame page on Stankovic
 The Man Who Changed International Basketball, CorD Magazine

1925 births
2020 deaths
Basketball executives
Bosnia and Herzegovina expatriate basketball people in Serbia
Chevaliers of the Légion d'honneur
Centers (basketball)
FIBA Hall of Fame inductees
International Olympic Committee members
KK Crvena zvezda players
KK Crvena zvezda youth coaches
KK Partizan coaches
KK Partizan players
KK Železničar Beograd players
Male veterinarians
Naismith Memorial Basketball Hall of Fame inductees
OKK Beograd coaches
Pallacanestro Cantù coaches
People from Bihać
Player-coaches
Recipients of the Cross of the Order of Merit of the Federal Republic of Germany
Serbian basketball executives and administrators
Serbian expatriate basketball people in Italy
Serbian expatriate basketball people in Switzerland
Serbian men's basketball coaches
Serbian men's basketball players
Serbian table tennis players
Serbs of Bosnia and Herzegovina
Serbian people of Czech descent
University of Belgrade Faculty of Veterinary Medicine alumni
Yugoslav basketball coaches
Yugoslav table tennis players
Yugoslav men's basketball players
1950 FIBA World Championship players
1942 Belgrade Basketball Championship players
Recipients of orders, decorations, and medals of Senegal